Grange Hill is a British drama television series that focuses on the lives of the pupils at the fictional North London comprehensive school, Grange Hill, in the fictitious London borough of Northam; from series 26, the school ceased to have a specific location. 601 episodes aired across 31 series.


Series overview

Series 1 (1978) 

{| class="wikitable" style="width:100%;"
|-
! style="background-color: #FFF434; color:white"| No.
! style="background: #FFF434; color:white"| Episode
! style="background: #FFF434; color:white"| Writer
! style="background: #FFF434; color:white"| Director
! style="background: #FFF434; color:white"| Original airdate
! style="background: #FFF434; color:white"| UK viewers (millions)
|-
| align="center"| 1
| align="center"| Episode One
| align="center"| Phil Redmond
| align="center"| Colin Cant
| align="center"| 8 February 1978
| align="center"| TBC
|-
| align="center"| 2
| align="center"| Episode Two
| align="center"| Phil Redmond
| align="center"| Colin Cant
| align="center"| 15 February 1978
| align="center"| TBC
|-
| align="center"| 3
| align="center"| Episode Three
| align="center"| Phil Redmond
| align="center"| Colin Cant
| align="center"| 22 February 1978
| align="center"| TBC
|-
| align="center"| 4
| align="center"| Episode Four
| align="center"| Phil Redmond
| align="center"| Colin Cant
| align="center"| 1 March 1978
| align="center"| TBC
|-
| align="center"| 5
| align="center"| Episode Five
| align="center"| Phil Redmond
| align="center"| Colin Cant
| align="center"| 8 March 1978
| align="center"| TBC
|-
| align="center"| 6
| align="center"| Episode Six
| align="center"| Phil Redmond
| align="center"| Colin Cant
| align="center"| 15 March 1978
| align="center"| TBC
|-
| align="center"| 7
| align="center"| Episode Seven
| align="center"| Phil Redmond
| align="center"| Colin Cant
| align="center"| 22 March 1978
| align="center"| TBC
|-
| align="center"| 8
| align="center"| Episode Eight
| align="center"| Phil Redmond
| align="center"| Colin Cant
| align="center"| 29 March 1978
| align="center"| TBC
|-
| align="center"| 9
| align="center"| Episode Nine
| align="center"| Phil Redmond
| align="center"| Colin Cant
| align="center"| 5 April 1978
| align="center"| TBC
|-
|}

Series 2 (1979) 

{| class="wikitable" style="width:100%;"
|-
! style="background-color: #58111A; color:white"| No.
! style="background: #58111A; color:white"| Episode
! style="background: #58111A; color:white"| Writer
! style="background: #58111A; color:white"| Director
! style="background: #58111A; color:white"| Original airdate
! style="background: #58111A; color:white"| UK viewers (millions)
|-
| align="center"| 10
| align="center"| Episode One
| align="center"| Phil Redmond
| align="center"| Colin Cant
| align="center"| 2 January 1979
| align="center"| TBC
|- 
| align="center"| 11
| align="center"| Episode Two
| align="center"| Phil Redmond
| align="center"| Colin Grant
| align="center"| 5 January 1979
| align="center"| TBC
|-
| align="center"| 12
| align="center"| Episode Three
| align="center"| Phil Redmond & Alan Janes
| align="center"| Colin Grant
| align="center"| 9 January 1979
| align="center"| TBC
|-
| align="center"| 13
| align="center"| Episode Four
| align="center"| Phil Redmond & Margaret Simpson
| align="center"| Colin Grant
| align="center"| 12 January 1979
| align="center"| TBC
|-
| align="center"| 14
| align="center"| Episode Five
| align="center"| Phil Redmond & Margaret Simpson
| align="center"| Colin Grant
| align="center"| 16 January 1979
| align="center"| TBC
|-
| align="center"| 15
| align="center"| Episode Six
| align="center"| Phil Redmond
| align="center"| Roger Singleton-Turner
| align="center"| 19 January 1979
| align="center"| TBC
|-
| align="center"| 16
| align="center"| Episode Seven
| align="center"| Phil Redmond
| align="center"| Roger Singleton-Turner
| align="center"| 23 January 1979
| align="center"| TBC
|-
| align="center"| 17
| align="center"| Episode Eight
| align="center"| Phil Redmond & Alan Janes
| align="center"| Colin Grant
| align="center"| 26 January 1979
| align="center"| TBC
|-
| align="center"| 18
| align="center"| Episode Nine
| align="center"| Phil Redmond & Margaret Simpson
| align="center"| Roger Singleton-Turner
| align="center"| 30 January 1979
| align="center"| TBC
|-
| align="center"| 19
| align="center"| Episode Ten
| align="center"| Phil Redmond
| align="center"| Roger Singleton-Turner
| align="center"| 2 February 1979
| align="center"| TBC
|-
| align="center"| 20
| align="center"| Episode Eleven
| align="center"| Phil Redmond
| align="center"| Colin Grant
| align="center"| 6 February 1979
| align="center"| TBC
|-
| align="center"| 21
| align="center"| Episode Twelve
| align="center"| Phil Redmond
| align="center"| Roger Singleton-Turner
| align="center"| 9 February 1979
| align="center"| TBC
|-
| align="center"| 22
| align="center"| Episode Thirteen
| align="center"| Phil Redmond & Margaret Simpson
| align="center"| Colin Grant
| align="center"| 13 February 1979
| align="center"| TBC
|-
| align="center"| 23
| align="center"| Episode Fourteen
| align="center"| Phil Redmond
| align="center"| Roger Singleton-Turner
| align="center"| 16 February 1979
| align="center"| TBC
|-
| align="center"| 24
| align="center"| Episode Fifteen
| align="center"| Phil Redmond & Alan Janes
| align="center"| Colin Grant
| align="center"| 20 February 1979
| align="center"| TBC
|-
| align="center"| 25
| align="center"| Episode Sixteen
| align="center"| Phil Redmond & Alan Janes
| align="center"| Colin Grant
| align="center"| 23 February 1979
| align="center"| TBC
|-
| align="center"| 26
| align="center"| Episode Seventeen
| align="center"| Phil Redmond & Margaret Simpson
| align="center"| Colin Grant
| align="center"| 27 February 1979
| align="center"| TBC
|-
| align="center"| 27
| align="center"| Episode Eighteen
| align="center"| Phil Redmond
| align="center"| Roger Singleton-Turner
| align="center"| 2 March 1979
| align="center"| TBC
|-
|}

Series 3 (1980) 

{| class="wikitable" style="width:100%;"
|-
! style="background-color: #808080; color:white"| No.
! style="background: #808080; color:white"| Episode
! style="background: #808080; color:white"| Writer
! style="background: #808080; color:white"| Director
! style="background: #808080; color:white"| Original airdate
! style="background: #808080; color:white"| UK viewers (millions)
|-
| align="center"| 28
| align="center"| Episode One
| align="center"| Phil Redmond
| align="center"| Brian Lennane
| align="center"| 8 January 1980
| align="center"| TBC
|- 
| align="center"| 29
| align="center"| Episode Two
| align="center"| Phil Redmond
| align="center"| Brian Lennane
| align="center"| 11 January 1980
| align="center"| TBC
|-
| align="center"| 30
| align="center"| Episode Three
| align="center"| Phil Redmond
| align="center"| Jackie Willows
| align="center"| 15 January 1980
| align="center"| TBC
|-
| align="center"| 31
| align="center"| Episode Four
| align="center"| Phil Redmond & Margaret Simpson
| align="center"| Jackie Willows
| align="center"| 18 January 1980
| align="center"| TBC
|-
| align="center"| 32
| align="center"| Episode Five
| align="center"| Phil Redmond & Margaret Simpson
| align="center"| Brian Lennane
| align="center"| 22 January 1980
| align="center"| TBC
|-
| align="center"| 33
| align="center"| Episode Six
| align="center"| Phil Redmond
| align="center"| Brian Lennane
| align="center"| 25 January 1980
| align="center"| TBC
|-
| align="center"| 34
| align="center"| Episode Seven
| align="center"| Phil Redmond & Margaret Simpson
| align="center"| Jackie Willows
| align="center"| 29 January 1980
| align="center"| TBC
|-
| align="center"| 35
| align="center"| Episode Eight
| align="center"| Phil Redmond
| align="center"| Jackie Willows
| align="center"| 1 February 1980
| align="center"| TBC
|-
| align="center"| 36
| align="center"| Episode Nine
| align="center"| Phil Redmond
| align="center"| Brian Lennane
| align="center"| 5 February 1980
| align="center"| TBC
|-
| align="center"| 37
| align="center"| Episode Ten
| align="center"| Phil Redmond
| align="center"| Brian Lennane
| align="center"| 8 February 1980
| align="center"| TBC
|-
| align="center"| 38
| align="center"| Episode Eleven
| align="center"| Phil Redmond
| align="center"| Brian Lennane
| align="center"| 12 February 1980
| align="center"| TBC
|-
| align="center"| 39
| align="center"| Episode Twelve
| align="center"| Phil Redmond & Alan Janes
| align="center"| Brian Lennane
| align="center"| 15 February 1980
| align="center"| TBC
|-
| align="center"| 40
| align="center"| Episode Thirteen
| align="center"| Phil Redmond
| align="center"| Brian Lennane
| align="center"| 19 February 1980
| align="center"| TBC
|-
| align="center"| 41
| align="center"| Episode Fourteen
| align="center"| Phil Redmond & Alan Janes
| align="center"| Jackie Willows
| align="center"| 22 February 1980
| align="center"| TBC
|-
| align="center"| 42
| align="center"| Episode Fifteen
| align="center"| Phil Redmond & Alan Janes
| align="center"| Roger Singleton-Turner
| align="center"| 26 February 1980
| align="center"| TBC
|-
| align="center"| 43
| align="center"| Episode Sixteen
| align="center"| Phil Redmond
| align="center"| Roger Singleton-Turner
| align="center"| 29 February 1980
| align="center"| TBC
|-
|}

Series 4 (1980–1981) 

{| class="wikitable" style="width:100%;"
|-
! style="background-color: #ACE5EE; color:white"| No.
! style="background: #ACE5EE; color:white"| Episode
! style="background: #ACE5EE; color:white"| Writer
! style="background: #ACE5EE; color:white"| Director
! style="background: #ACE5EE; color:white"| Original airdate
! style="background: #ACE5EE; color:white"| UK viewers (millions)
|-
| align="center"| 44
| align="center"| Episode One
| align="center"| Phil Redmond
| align="center"| Colin Cant
| align="center"| 30 December 1980
| align="center"| TBC
|-
| align="center"| 45
| align="center"| Episode Two
| align="center"| Phil Redmond
| align="center"| Colin Cant
| align="center"| 2 January 1981
| align="center"| TBC
|-
| align="center"| 46
| align="center"| Episode Three
| align="center"| Phil Redmond & Sandy Welch
| align="center"| Christine Secombe
| align="center"| 6 January 1981
| align="center"| TBC
|-
| align="center"| 47
| align="center"| Episode Four
| align="center"| Phil Redmond
| align="center"| Colin Cant
| align="center"| 9 January 1981
| align="center"| TBC
|-
| align="center"| 48
| align="center"| Episode Five
| align="center"| Phil Redmond & Sandy Welch
| align="center"| Christine Secombe
| align="center"| 13 January 1981
| align="center"| TBC
|-
| align="center"| 49
| align="center"| Episode Six
| align="center"| Phil Redmond
| align="center"| Sarah Hellings
| align="center"| 16 January 1981
| align="center"| TBC
|-
| align="center"| 50
| align="center"| Episode Seven
| align="center"| Phil Redmond & Alan Janes
| align="center"| Christine Secombe
| align="center"| 20 January 1981
| align="center"| TBC
|-
| align="center"| 51
| align="center"| Episode Eight
| align="center"| Phil Redmond & Alan Janes
| align="center"| Christine Secombe
| align="center"| 23 January 1981
| align="center"| TBC
|-
| align="center"| 52
| align="center"| Episode Nine
| align="center"| Phil Redmond & Margaret Simpson
| align="center"| Christine Secombe
| align="center"| 27 January 1981
| align="center"| TBC
|-
| align="center"| 53
| align="center"| Episode Ten
| align="center"| Phil Redmond & Margaret Simpson
| align="center"| Christine Secombe
| align="center"| 30 January 1981
| align="center"| TBC
|-
| align="center"| 54
| align="center"| Episode Eleven
| align="center"| Alan Janes
| align="center"| Christine Secombe
| align="center"| 3 February 1981
| align="center"| TBC
|-
| align="center"| 55
| align="center"| Episode Twelve
| align="center"| Phil Redmond & Alan Janes
| align="center"| Colin Cant
| align="center"| 6 February 1981
| align="center"| TBC
|-
| align="center"| 56
| align="center"| Episode Thirteen
| align="center"| Phil Redmond
| align="center"| Colin Cant
| align="center"| 10 February 1981
| align="center"| TBC
|-
| align="center"| 57
| align="center"| Episode Fourteen
| align="center"| Alan Janes
| align="center"| Colin Cant
| align="center"| 13 February 1981
| align="center"| TBC
|-
| align="center"| 58
| align="center"| Episode Fifteen
| align="center"| Alan Janes
| align="center"| Graham Theakston
| align="center"| 17 February 1981
| align="center"| TBC
|-
| align="center"| 59
| align="center"| Episode Sixteen
| align="center"| Phil Redmond
| align="center"| Colin Cant
| align="center"| 20 February 1981
| align="center"| TBC
|-
| align="center"| 60
| align="center"| Episode Seventeen
| align="center"| Jane Hollowood & Alan Janes
| align="center"| Graham Theakston
| align="center"| 24 February 1981
| align="center"| TBC
|-
| align="center"| 61
| align="center"| Episode Eighteen
| align="center"| Phil Redmond
| align="center"| Christine Secombe
| align="center"| 27 February 1981
| align="center"| TBC
|-
| align="center"| 62
| align="center"| Christmas Special
| align="center"| Phil Redmond & Paul Manning
| align="center"| Hugh David
| align="center"| 28 December 1981
| align="center"| TBC
|-
|}

Series 5 (1982) 

{| class="wikitable" style="width:100%;"
|-
! style="background-color: #FF99CC; color:white"| No.
! style="background: #FF99CC; color:white"| Episode
! style="background: #FF99CC; color:white"| Writer
! style="background: #FF99CC; color:white"| Director
! style="background: #FF99CC; color:white"| Original airdate
! style="background: #FF99CC; color:white"| UK viewers (millions)
|-
| align="center"| 63
| align="center"| Arrival
| align="center"| Alan Janes
| align="center"| Diarmuid Lawrence
| align="center"| 5 January 1982
| align="center"| TBC
|-
| align="center"| 64
| align="center"| Settling In
| align="center"| Alan Jane 
| align="center"| Anthea Browne-Wilkinson
| align="center"| 8 January 1982
| align="center"| TBC
|-
| align="center"| 65
| align="center"| Sex Education
| align="center"| Jane Hollowood
| align="center"| Anthea Browne-Wilkinson
| align="center"| 12 January 1982
| align="center"| TBC
|-
| align="center"| 66
| align="center"| Text Books
| align="center"| Margaret Simpson
| align="center"| Anthea Browne-Wilkinson
| align="center"| 15 January 1982
| align="center"| TBC
|-
| align="center"| 67
| align="center"| Instruments
| align="center"| Margaret Simpson
| align="center"| Anthea Browne-Wilkinson
| align="center"| 19 January 1982
| align="center"| TBC
|-
| align="center"| 68
| align="center"| Sports Trials
| align="center"| Margaret Simpson
| align="center"| Christine Secombe
| align="center"| 22 January 1982
| align="center"| TBC
|-
| align="center"| 69
| align="center"| Saturday Job
| align="center"| Barry Purchese
| align="center"| John Prowse
| align="center"| 26 January 1982
| align="center"| TBC
|-
| align="center"| 70
| align="center"| Scruffy McDuffy
| align="center"| Barry Purchese
| align="center"| John Prowse
| align="center"| 29 January 1982
| align="center"| TBC
|-
| align="center"| 71
| align="center"| Stickers
| align="center"| Barry Purchese
| align="center"| John Prowse
| align="center"| 2 February 1982
| align="center"| TBC
|-
| align="center"| 72
| align="center"| Exploration
| align="center"| Barry Purchese
| align="center"| John Browse
| align="center"| 5 February 1982
| align="center"| TBC
|-
| align="center"| 73
| align="center"| Sponsorship
| align="center"| Jane Hollowood
| align="center"| John Prowse
| align="center"| 9 February 1982
| align="center"| TBC
|-
| align="center"| 74
| align="center"| Zoo
| align="center"| Jane Hollowood
| align="center"| Diarmuid Lawrence
| align="center"| 12 February 1982
| align="center"| TBC
|-
| align="center"| 75
| align="center"| Girl Gangs
| align="center"| Margaret Simpson
| align="center"| Anthea Browne-Wilkinson
| align="center"| 16 February 1982
| align="center"| TBC
|-
| align="center"| 76
| align="center"| Diary
| align="center"| Margaret Simpson
| align="center"| Anthea Browne-Wilkinson
| align="center"| 19 February 1982
| align="center"| TBC
|-
| align="center"| 77
| align="center"| Despair
| align="center"| Alan Janes
| align="center"| John Prowse
| align="center"| 23 February 1982
| align="center"| TBC
|-
| align="center"| 78
| align="center"| School Revue
| align="center"| Barry Purchese
| align="center"| Diarmuid Lawrence
| align="center"| 26 February 1982
| align="center"| TBC
|-

| align="center"| 79
| align="center"| Aftermath
| align="center"| Alan Janes
| align="center"| Anthea Browne-Wilkinson
| align="center"| 2 March 1982
| align="center"| TBC
|-
| align="center"| 80
| align="center"| Exams
| align="center"| Alan Janes
| align="center"| Anthea Browne-Wilkinson
| align="center"| 5 March 1982
| align="center"| TBC
|-
|}

Series 6 (1983) 

{| class="wikitable" style="width:100%;"
|-
! style="background-color: #FF0000; color:white"| No.
! style="background: #FF0000; color:white"| Episode
! style="background: #FF0000; color:white"| Writer
! style="background: #FF0000; color:white"| Director
! style="background: #FF0000; color:white"| Original airdate
! style="background: #FF0000; color:white"| UK viewers (millions)
|-
| align="center"| 81
| align="center"| Return
| align="center"| Barry Purchese
| align="center"| Carol Wilks
| align="center"| 4 January 1983
| align="center"| TBC
|-
| align="center"| 82
| align="center"| New Faces
| align="center"| Barry Purchese
| align="center"| Carol Wilks
| align="center"| 7 January 1983
| align="center"| TBC
|-
| align="center"| 83
| align="center"| Choices
| align="center"| Jane Hollowood
| align="center"| Edward Pugh
| align="center"| 11 January 1983
| align="center"| TBC
|-
| align="center"| 84
| align="center"| Thuggies
| align="center"| Jane Hollowood
| align="center"| Alistair Clarke
| align="center"| 14 January 1983
| align="center"| TBC
|-
| align="center"| 85
| align="center"| On Trial
| align="center"| Margaret Simpson
| align="center"| Carol Wilks
| align="center"| 18 January 1983
| align="center"| TBC
|-
| align="center"| 86
| align="center"| Field Trip
| align="center"| Margaret Simpson
| align="center"| TBA
| align="center"| 21 January 1983
| align="center"| TBC
|-
| align="center"| 87
| align="center"| Love Triangle
| align="center"| Margaret Simpson
| align="center"| Carol Wilks 
| align="center"| 25 January 1983
| align="center"| TBC
|-
| align="center"| 88
| align="center"| Weightwatchers
| align="center"| David Angus
| align="center"| Alistair Clarke
| align="center"| 28 January 1983
| align="center"| TBC
|-
| align="center"| 89
| align="center"| Open Day
| align="center"| Paula Milne
| align="center"| Alistair Clarke
| align="center"| 1 February 1983
| align="center"| TBC
|-
| align="center"| 90
| align="center"| An Inspector Calls
| align="center"| Margaret Simpson
| align="center"| Alistair Clarke
| align="center"| 4 February 1983
| align="center"| TBC
|-
| align="center"| 91
| align="center"| Paper Chase
| align="center"| David Angus
| align="center"| Carol Wilks
| align="center"| 8 February 1983
| align="center"| TBC
|-
| align="center"| 92
| align="center"|Publication
| align="center"| Margaret Simpson
| align="center"| Carol Wilks
| align="center"| 11 February 1983
| align="center"| TBC
|-
| align="center"| 93
| align="center"| Backlash
| align="center"| Barry Purchese
| align="center"| Alistair Clarke
| align="center"| 15 February 1983
| align="center"| TBC
|-
| align="center"| 94
| align="center"| Repercussions
| align="center"| Barry Purchese
| align="center"| Alistair Clarke
| align="center"| 18 February 1983
| align="center"| TBC
|-
| align="center"| 95
| align="center"| Outward Bound – Part 1
| align="center"| Jane Hollowood
| align="center"| TBA
| align="center"| 22 February 1983
| align="center"| TBC
|-
| align="center"| 96 
| align="center"| Outward Bound – Part 2
| align="center"| Jane Hollowood
| align="center"| TBA
| align="center"| 25 February 1983
| align="center"| TBC
|-
| align="center"| 97
| align="center"|Sympathy
| align="center"| Barry Purchese
| align="center"| Edward Pugh
| align="center"| 1 March 1983
| align="center"| TBC
|-
| align="center"| 98
| align="center"| Rally
| align="center"| Barry Purchese
| align="center"| TBA
| align="center"| 4 March 1983
| align="center"| TBC
|-
|}

Series 7 (1984) 

{| class="wikitable" style="width:100%;"
|-
! style="background-color: #FF681F; color:white"| No.
! style="background: #FF681F; color:white"| Episode
! style="background: #FF681F; color:white"| Writer(s)
! style="background: #FF681F; color:white"| Director
! style="background: #FF681F; color:white"| Original airdate
! style="background: #FF681F; color:white"| UK viewers (millions)
|-
| align="center"| 99
| align="center"| Episode One
| align="center"| Phil Redmond and Barry Purchese
| align="center"| Carol Wilks
| align="center"| 3 January 1984
| align="center"| TBC
|-
| align="center"| 100
| align="center"| Episode Two
| align="center"| Phil Redmond and Margaret Simpson
| align="center"| Carol Wilks
| align="center"| 6 January 1984
| align="center"| TBC
|-
| align="center"| 101
| align="center"| Episode Three
| align="center"| Phil Redmond and David Angus
| align="center"| Nic Phillips
| align="center"| 10 January 1984
| align="center"| TBC
|-
| align="center"| 102
| align="center"| Episode Four
| align="center"| Phil Redmond and David Angus
| align="center"| Nic Phillips
| align="center"| 13 January 1984
| align="center"| TBC
|-
| align="center"| 103
| align="center"| Episode Five
| align="center"| Phil Redmond and David Angus
| align="center"| Nic Phillips
| align="center"| 17 January 1984
| align="center"| TBC
|-
| align="center"| 104
| align="center"| Episode Six
| align="center"| Phil Redmond and Barry Purchese
| align="center"| Carol Wilks
| align="center"| 20 January 1984
| align="center"| TBC
|-
| align="center"| 105
| align="center"| Episode Seven
| align="center"| Phil Redmond and Frances Galleymore
| align="center"| David Bell
| align="center"| 24 January 1984
| align="center"| TBC
|-
| align="center"| 106
| align="center"| Episode Eight
| align="center"| Phil Redmond and Margaret Simpson
| align="center"| TBA
| align="center"| 27 January 1984
| align="center"| TBC
|-
| align="center"| 107
| align="center"| Episode Nine
| align="center"| Phil Redmond and Margaret Simpson
| align="center"| TBA
| align="center"| 31 January 1984
| align="center"| TBC
|-
| align="center"| 108
| align="center"| Episode Ten
| align="center"| Phil Redmond and Barry Purchese
| align="center"| Edward Pugh
| align="center"| 3 February 1984
| align="center"| TBC
|-
| align="center"| 109
| align="center"| Episode Eleven
| align="center"| Phil Redmond and Jane Hollowood
| align="center"| TBA
| align="center"| 7 February 1984
| align="center"| TBC
|-
| align="center"| 110
| align="center"| Episode Twelve
| align="center"| Phil Redmond and Barry Purchese
| align="center"| Nic Phillips
| align="center"| 10 February 1984
| align="center"| TBC
|-
| align="center"| 111
| align="center"| Episode Thirteen
| align="center"| Phil Redmond and Barry Purchese
| align="center"| Nic Phillips
| align="center"| 14 February 1984
| align="center"| TBC
|-
| align="center"| 112
| align="center"| Episode Fourteen
| align="center"| Phil Redmond and Frances Galleymore
| align="center"| Edward Pugh
| align="center"| 17 February 1984
| align="center"| TBC
|-
| align="center"| 113
| align="center"| Episode Fifteen
| align="center"| Phil Redmond and Barry Purchese
| align="center"| Nic Phillips
| align="center"| 21 February 1984
| align="center"| TBC
|-
| align="center"| 114
| align="center"| Episode Sixteen
| align="center"| Phil Redmond and Barry Purchese
| align="center"| Nic Phillips
| align="center"| 24 February 1984
| align="center"| TBC
|-
| align="center"| 115
| align="center"| Episode Seventeen
| align="center"| Phil Redmond and Jane Hollowood
| align="center"| TBA
| align="center"| 28 February 1984
| align="center"| TBC
|-
| align="center"| 116
| align="center"| Episode Eighteen
| align="center"| Phil Redmond and Barry Purchese
| align="center"| Edward Pugh
| align="center"| 2 March 1984
| align="center"| TBC
|-
|}

Series 8 (1985) 

{| class="wikitable" style="width:100%;"
|-
! style="background-color: #FFE5B4; color:white"| No.
! style="background: #FFE5B4; color:white"| Episode
! style="background: #FFE5B4; color:white"| Writer(s)
! style="background: #FFE5B4; color:white"| Director
! style="background: #FFE5B4; color:white"| Original airdate
! style="background: #FFE5B4; color:white"| UK viewers (millions)

|-
| align="center"| 117
| align="center"| Episode One
| align="center"| Barry Purchese and Anthony Minghella
| align="center"| Edward Pugh
| align="center"| 18 February 1985
| align="center"| TBC
|-
| align="center"| 118
| align="center"| Episode Two
| align="center"| David Angus and Anthony Minghella
| align="center"| Edward Pugh
| align="center"| 20 February 1985
| align="center"| TBC
|-
| align="center"| 119
| align="center"| Episode Three
| align="center"| David Angus and Anthony Minghella
| align="center"| Margie Barbour
| align="center"| 25 February 1985
| align="center"| TBC
|-
| align="center"| 120
| align="center"| Episode Four
| align="center"| David Angus and Anthony Minghella
| align="center"| Roger Singleton-Turner
| align="center"| 27 February 1985
| align="center"| TBC
|-
| align="center"| 121
| align="center"| Episode Five
| align="center"| Margaret Simpson and Anthony Minghella
| align="center"| Margie Barbour
| align="center"| 4 March 1985
| align="center"| TBC
|-
| align="center"| 122
| align="center"| Episode Six
| align="center"| John Godber and Anthony Minghella
| align="center"| Roger Singleton-Turner
| align="center"| 6 March 1985
| align="center"| TBC
|-
| align="center"| 123
| align="center"| Episode Seven
| align="center"| Margaret Simpson
| align="center"| Edward Pugh
| align="center"| 11 March 1985
| align="center"| TBC
|-
| align="center"| 124
| align="center"| Episode Eight
| align="center"| Barry Purchese 
| align="center"| Edward Pugh
| align="center"| 13 March 1985
| align="center"| TBC
|-
| align="center"| 125
| align="center"| Episode Nine
| align="center"| Barry Purchese 
| align="center"| Margie Barbour
| align="center"| 18 March 1985
| align="center"| TBC
|-
| align="center"| 126
| align="center"| Episode Ten
| align="center"| Rosemary Mason
| align="center"| TBA
| align="center"| 20 March 1985
| align="center"| TBC
|-
| align="center"| 127
| align="center"| Episode Eleven
| align="center"| Rosemary Mason
| align="center"| Roger Singleton-Turner
| align="center"| 25 March 1985
| align="center"| TBC
|-
| align="center"| 128
| align="center"| Episode Twelve
| align="center"| Frances Galleymore
| align="center"| Roger Singleton-Turner
| align="center"| 27 March 1985
| align="center"| TBC
|-
| align="center"| 129
| align="center"| Episode Thirteen
| align="center"| Frances Galleymore
| align="center"| John Smith
| align="center"| 1 April 1985
| align="center"| TBC
|-
| align="center"| 130
| align="center"| Episode Fourteen
| align="center"| Anthony Minghella and Barry Purchese
| align="center"| John Smith
| align="center"| 3 April 1985
| align="center"| TBC
|-
| align="center"| 131
| align="center"| Episode Fifteen
| align="center"| John Godber
| align="center"| David Bell
| align="center"| 10 April 1985
| align="center"| TBC
|-
| align="center"| 132
| align="center"| Episode Sixteen
| align="center"| Margaret Simpson
| align="center"| John Godber
| align="center"| 15 April 1985
| align="center"| TBC
|-
| align="center"| 133
| align="center"| Episode Seventeen
| align="center"| Margaret Simpson and Anthony Minghella
| align="center"| Roger Singleton-Turner
| align="center"| 17 April 1985
| align="center"| TBC
|-
| align="center"| 134
| align="center"| Episode Eighteen
| align="center"| Barry Purchese
| align="center"| Roger Singleton-Turner
| align="center"| 22 April 1985
| align="center"| TBC
|-
| align="center"| 135
| align="center"| Christmas Special
| align="center"| Phil Redmond
| align="center"| John Smith
| align="center"| 27 December 1985
| align="center"| TBC
|-
|}

Series 9 (1986) 

{| class="wikitable" style="width:100%;"
|-
! style="background: #003366; color:white"| No.
! style="background: #003366; color:white"| Episode
! style="background: #003366; color:white"| Writer
! style="background: #003366; color:white"| Director
! style="background: #003366; color:white"| Original airdate
! style="background: #003366; color:white"| UK viewers (millions)
|-
| align="center"| 136
| align="center"| Episode One
| align="center"| Barry Purchese
| align="center"| Edward Pugh
| align="center"| 7 January 1986
| align="center"| TBC
|- 
| align="center"| 137
| align="center"| Episode Two
| align="center"| Barry Purchese
| align="center"| Edward Pugh
| align="center"| 10 January 1986
| align="center"| TBC
|-
| align="center"| 138
| align="center"| Episode Three
| align="center"| David Angus
| align="center"| Edward Pugh
| align="center"| 14 January 1986
| align="center"| TBC
|-
| align="center"| 139
| align="center"| Episode Four
| align="center"| David Angus
| align="center"| Edward Pugh
| align="center"| 17 January 1986
| align="center"| TBC
|-
| align="center"| 140
| align="center"| Episode Five
| align="center"| Margaret Simpson
| align="center"| Roger Singleton-Turner
| align="center"| 21 January 1986
| align="center"| TBC
|-
| align="center"| 141
| align="center"| Episode Six
| align="center"| Margaret Simpson
| align="center"| Roger Singleton-Turner
| align="center"| 24 January 1986
| align="center"| TBC
|-
| align="center"| 142
| align="center"| Episode Seven
| align="center"| Frances Galleymore
| align="center"| Roger Singleton-Turner
| align="center"| 28 January 1986
| align="center"| TBC
|-
| align="center"| 143
| align="center"| Episode Eight
| align="center"| Frances Galleymore
| align="center"| Roger Singleton-Turner
| align="center"| 31 January 1986
| align="center"| TBC
|-
| align="center"| 144
| align="center"| Episode Nine
| align="center"| Sarah Daniels
| align="center"| Margie Barbour
| align="center"| 4 February 1986
| align="center"| TBC
|-
| align="center"| 145
| align="center"| Episode Ten
| align="center"| Sarah Daniels
| align="center"| Margie Barbour
| align="center"| 7 February 1986
| align="center"| TBC
|-
| align="center"| 146
| align="center"| Episode Eleven
| align="center"| John Godber
| align="center"| David Bell
| align="center"| 11 February 1986
| align="center"| TBC
|-
| align="center"| 147
| align="center"| Episode Twelve
| align="center"| Barry Purchese
| align="center"| David Bell
| align="center"| 14 February 1986
| align="center"| TBC
|-
| align="center"| 148
| align="center"| Episode Thirteen
| align="center"| Margaret Simpson
| align="center"| David Bell
| align="center"| 18 February 1986
| align="center"| TBC
|-
| align="center"| 149
| align="center"| Episode Fourteen
| align="center"| Margaret Simpson
| align="center"| David Bell
| align="center"| 21 February 1986
| align="center"| TBC
|-
| align="center"| 150
| align="center"| Episode Fifteen
| align="center"| Rosemary Mason
| align="center"| John Smith
| align="center"| 25 February 1986
| align="center"| TBC
|-
| align="center"| 151
| align="center"| Episode Sixteen
| align="center"| Rosemary Mason
| align="center"| John Smith
| align="center"| 28 February 1986
| align="center"| TBC
|-
| align="center"| 152
| align="center"| Episode Seventeen
| align="center"| Margaret Simpson
| align="center"| John Smith
| align="center"| 4 March 1986
| align="center"| TBC
|-
| align="center"| 153
| align="center"| Episode Eighteen
| align="center"| Margaret Simpson
| align="center"| Roger Singleton-Turner
| align="center"| 7 March 1986
| align="center"| TBC
|-
| align="center"| 154
| align="center"| Episode Nineteen
| align="center"| Barry Purchese
| align="center"| Roger Singleton-Turner
| align="center"| 11 March 1986
| align="center"| TBC
|-
| align="center"| 155
| align="center"| Episode Twenty
| align="center"| Barry Purchese
| align="center"| Margie Barbour
| align="center"| 14 March 1986
| align="center"| TBC
|-
| align="center"| 156
| align="center"| Episode Twenty-One
| align="center"| Barry Purchese
| align="center"| Margie Barbour
| align="center"| 18 March 1986
| align="center"| TBC
|-
| align="center"| 157
| align="center"| Episode Twenty-Two
| align="center"| Barry Purchese
| align="center"| Margie Barbour
| align="center"| 21 March 1986
| align="center"| TBC
|-
| align="center"| 158
| align="center"| Episode Twenty-Three
| align="center"| David Angus
| align="center"| Margie Barbour
| align="center"| 25 March 1986
| align="center"| TBC
|-
| align="center"| 159
| align="center"| Episode Twenty-Four
| align="center"| David Angus
| align="center"| Margie Barbour
| align="center"| 1 April 1986
| align="center"| TBC
|-
|}

Series 10 (1987) 

{| class="wikitable" style="width:100%;"
|-
! style="background: #B666D2; color:white"| No.
! style="background: #B666D2; color:white"| Episode
! style="background: #B666D2; color:white"| Writer
! style="background: #B666D2; color:white"| Director
! style="background: #B666D2; color:white"| Original airdate
! style="background: #B666D2; color:white"| UK viewers (millions)
|-
| align="center"| 160
| align="center"| Episode One
| align="center"| Barry Purchese
| align="center"| Edward Pugh
| align="center"| 6 January 1987
| align="center"| TBC
|-
| align="center"| 161
| align="center"| Episode Two
| align="center"| Barry Purchese
| align="center"| Edward Pugh
| align="center"| 9 January 1987 
| align="center"| TBC
|-
| align="center"| 162
| align="center"| Episode Three
| align="center"| David Angus
| align="center"| Edward Pugh
| align="center"| 13 January 1987 
| align="center"| TBC
|-
| align="center"| 163
| align="center"| Episode Four
| align="center"| David Angus
| align="center"| Edward Pugh
| align="center"| 16 January 1987 
| align="center"| TBC
|-
| align="center"| 164
| align="center"| Episode Five
| align="center"| Margaret Simpson
| align="center"| Roger Singleton-Turner
| align="center"| 20 January 1987 
| align="center"| TBC
|-
| align="center"| 165
| align="center"| Episode Six
| align="center"| Margaret Simpson
| align="center"| Roger Singleton-Turner
| align="center"| 23 January 1987 
| align="center"| TBC
|-
| align="center"| 166
| align="center"| Episode Seven
| align="center"| Frances Galleymore
| align="center"| Roger Singleton-Turner
| align="center"| 27 January 1987
| align="center"| TBC
|-
| align="center"| 167
| align="center"| Episode Eight
| align="center"| Frances Galleymore
| align="center"| Roger Singleton-Turner
| align="center"| 30 January 1987 
| align="center"| TBC
|-
| align="center"| 168
| align="center"| Episode Nine
| align="center"| Sarah Daniels
| align="center"| Margie Barbour
| align="center"| 3 February 1987 
| align="center"| TBC
|-
| align="center"| 169
| align="center"| Episode Ten
| align="center"| Sarah Daniels
| align="center"| Margie Barbour
| align="center"| 6 February 1987
| align="center"| TBC
|-
| align="center"| 170
| align="center"| Episode Eleven
| align="center"| John Godber
| align="center"| David Bell
| align="center"| 10 February 1987
| align="center"| TBC
|-
| align="center"| 171
| align="center"| Episode Twelve
| align="center"| Barry Purchese
| align="center"| David Bell
| align="center"| 13 February 1987
| align="center"| TBC
|-
| align="center"| 172
| align="center"| Episode Thirteen
| align="center"| Margaret Simpson
| align="center"| David Bell
| align="center"| 17 February 1987
| align="center"| TBC
|-
| align="center"| 173
| align="center"| Episode Fourteen
| align="center"| Margaret Simpson
| align="center"| David Bell
| align="center"| 20 February 1987
| align="center"| TBC
|-
| align="center"| 174
| align="center"| Episode Fifteen
| align="center"| Rosemary Mason
| align="center"| John Smith
| align="center"| 24 February 1987
| align="center"| TBC
|-
| align="center"| 175
| align="center"| Episode Sixteen
| align="center"| Rosemary Mason
| align="center"| John Smith
| align="center"| 27 February 1987
| align="center"| TBC
|-
| align="center"| 176
| align="center"| Episode Seventeen
| align="center"| Margaret Simpson
| align="center"| John Smith
| align="center"| 3 March 1987
| align="center"| TBC
|-
| align="center"| 177
| align="center"| Episode Eighteen
| align="center"| Margaret Simpson
| align="center"| Roger Singleton-Turner
| align="center"| 6 March 1987
| align="center"| TBC
|-
| align="center"| 178
| align="center"| Episode Nineteen
| align="center"| Barry Purchese
| align="center"| Roger Singleton-Turner
| align="center"| 10 March 1987
| align="center"| TBC
|-
| align="center"| 179
| align="center"| Episode Twenty
| align="center"| Barry Purchese
| align="center"| Margie Barbour
| align="center"| 13 March 1987
| align="center"| TBC
|-
| align="center"| 180
| align="center"| Episode Twenty-One
| align="center"| Barry Purchese
| align="center"| Margie Barbour
| align="center"| 17 March 1987
| align="center"| TBC
|-
| align="center"| 181
| align="center"| Episode Twenty-Two
| align="center"| Barry Purchese
| align="center"| Margie Barbour
| align="center"| 20 March 1987 
| align="center"| TBC
|-
| align="center"| 182
| align="center"| Episode Twenty-Three
| align="center"| David Angus
| align="center"| Margie Barbour
| align="center"| 24 March 1987 
| align="center"| TBC
|-
| align="center"| 183
| align="center"| Episode Twenty-Four
| align="center"| David Angus
| align="center"| Margie Barbour
| align="center"| 27 March 1987 
| align="center"| TBC
|-
|}

Series 11 (1988) 

{| class="wikitable" style="width:100%;"
|-
! style="background: #860111; color:white"| No.
! style="background: #860111; color:white"| Episode
! style="background: #860111; color:white"| Writer
! style="background: #860111; color:white"| Director
! style="background: #860111; color:white"| Original airdate
! style="background: #860111; color:white"| UK viewers (millions)
|-
| align="center"| 184
| align="center"| Episode One
| align="center"| Chris Ellis
| align="center"| Albert Barber
| align="center"| 5 January 1988
| align="center"| TBC
|-
| align="center"| 185
| align="center"| Episode Two
| align="center"| Chris Ellis
| align="center"| Albert Barber
| align="center"| 8 January 1988
| align="center"| TBC
|-
| align="center"| 186
| align="center"| Episode Three
| align="center"| David Angus
| align="center"| Albert Barber
| align="center"| 12 January 1988
| align="center"| TBC
|-
| align="center"| 187
| align="center"| Episode Four
| align="center"| David Angus
| align="center"| Albert Barber
| align="center"| 15 January 1988
| align="center"| TBC
|-
| align="center"| 188
| align="center"| Episode Five
| align="center"| David Angus
| align="center"| John Smith
| align="center"| 19 January 1988
| align="center"| TBC
|-
| align="center"| 189
| align="center"| Episode Six
| align="center"| David Angus
| align="center"| John Smith
| align="center"| 22 January 1988
| align="center"| TBC
|-
| align="center"| 190
| align="center"| Episode Seven
| align="center"| Sarah Daniels
| align="center"| John Smith
| align="center"| 26 January 1988
| align="center"| TBC
|-
| align="center"| 191
| align="center"| Episode Eight
| align="center"| Sarah Daniels
| align="center"| John Smith
| align="center"| 29 January 1988
| align="center"| TBC
|-
| align="center"| 192
| align="center"| Episode Nine
| align="center"| Margaret Simpson
| align="center"| Robert Gabriel
| align="center"| 2 February 1988
| align="center"| TBC
|-
| align="center"| 193
| align="center"| Episode Ten
| align="center"| Margaret Simpson
| align="center"| Robert Gabriel
| align="center"|5 February 1988
| align="center"| TBC
|-
| align="center"| 194
| align="center"| Episode Eleven
| align="center"| Margaret Simpson
| align="center"| Robert Gabriel
| align="center"| 9 February 1988
| align="center"| TBC
|-
| align="center"| 195
| align="center"| Episode Twelve
| align="center"| David Angus
| align="center"| Albert Barber
| align="center"| 12 February 1988
| align="center"| TBC 
|-
| align="center"| 196
| align="center"| Episode Thirteen
| align="center"| Kay Trainer
| align="center"| Albert Barber
| align="center"| 16 February 1988
| align="center"| TBC
|-
| align="center"| 197
| align="center"| Episode Fourteen
| align="center"| Barry Purchese
| align="center"| Albert Barber
| align="center"| 19 February 1988
| align="center"| TBC
|-
| align="center"| 198
| align="center"| Episode Fifteen
| align="center"| Barry Purchese
| align="center"| Albert Barber
| align="center"| 23 February 1988
| align="center"| TBC
|-
| align="center"| 199
| align="center"| Episode Sixteen
| align="center"| Barry Purchese
| align="center"| John Smith
| align="center"| 26 February 1988
| align="center"| TBC
|-
| align="center"| 200
| align="center"| Episode Seventeen
| align="center"| Barry Purchese
| align="center"| John Smith
| align="center"| 1 March 1988
| align="center"| TBC
|-
| align="center"| 201
| align="center"| Episode Eighteen
| align="center"| Barry Purchese
| align="center"| John Smith
| align="center"|4 March 1988
| align="center"| TBC
|-
| align="center"| 202
| align="center"| Episode Nineteen
| align="center"| Margaret Simpson
| align="center"| John Smith
| align="center"| 8 March 1988
| align="center"| TBC
|-
| align="center"| 203
| align="center"| Episode Twenty
| align="center"| Margaret Simpson
| align="center"| Robert Gabriel
| align="center"| 11 March 1988
| align="center"| TBC
|-
|}

Series 12 (1989) 

{| class="wikitable" style="width:100%;"
|-
! style="background: #E1AD01; color:white"| No.
! style="background: #E1AD01; color:white"| Episode
! style="background: #E1AD01; color:white"| Writer
! style="background: #E1AD01; color:white"| Director
! style="background: #E1AD01; color:white"| Original airdate
! style="background: #E1AD01; color:white"| UK viewers (millions)
|-
| align="center"| 204
| align="center"| Episode One
| align="center"| Barry Purchese
| align="center"| Laurence Williams
| align="center"| 3 January 1989
| align="center"| TBC
|-
| align="center"| 205
| align="center"| Episode Two
| align="center"| Barry Purchese
| align="center"| Albert Barber
| align="center"| 6 January 1989
| align="center"| TBC
|-
| align="center"| 206
| align="center"| Episode Three
| align="center"| Barry Purchese
| align="center"| Albert Barber
| align="center"| 10 January 1989
| align="center"| TBC
|-
| align="center"| 207
| align="center"| Episode Four
| align="center"| Margaret Simpson
| align="center"| Albert Barber
| align="center"| 13 January 1989
| align="center"| TBC
|-
| align="center"| 208
| align="center"| Episode Five
| align="center"| Kay Trainor
| align="center"| John Smith
| align="center"| 17 January 1989
| align="center"| TBC
|-
| align="center"| 209
| align="center"| Episode Six 
| align="center"| Kay Trainor
| align="center"| John Smith
| align="center"| 20 January 1989
| align="center"| TBC
|-
| align="center"| 210
| align="center"| Episode Seven
| align="center"| Chris Ellis
| align="center"| John Smith
| align="center"| 24 January 1989
| align="center"| TBC
|-
| align="center"| 211
| align="center"| Episode Eight
| align="center"| Chris Ellis
| align="center"| John Smith
| align="center"| 27 January 1989
| align="center"| TBC
|-
| align="center"| 212
| align="center"| Episode Nine
| align="center"| Margaret Simpson
| align="center"| Robert Gabriel
| align="center"| 31 January 1989
| align="center"| TBC
|-
| align="center"| 213
| align="center"| Episode Ten
| align="center"| Margaret Simpson
| align="center"| Robert Gabriel
| align="center"| 3 February 1989
| align="center"| TBC
|-
| align="center"| 214
| align="center"| Episode Eleven
| align="center"| David Angus
| align="center"| John Smith
| align="center"| 7 February 1989
| align="center"| TBC
|-
| align="center"| 215
| align="center"| Episode Twelve
| align="center"| David Angus
| align="center"| John Smith
| align="center"| 10 February 1989
| align="center"| TBC 
|-
| align="center"| 216
| align="center"| Episode Thirteen
| align="center"| Margaret Simpson
| align="center"| Robert Gabriel
| align="center"| 14 February 1989
| align="center"| TBC
|-
| align="center"| 217
| align="center"| Episode Fourteen
| align="center"| Margaret Simpson
| align="center"| Robert Gabriel
| align="center"| 17 February 1989
| align="center"| TBC
|-
| align="center"| 218
| align="center"| Episode Fifteen
| align="center"| Barry Purchese
| align="center"| John Smith
| align="center"| 21 February 1989
| align="center"| TBC
|-
| align="center"| 219
| align="center"| Episode Sixteen
| align="center"| Barry Purchese
| align="center"| John Smith
| align="center"| 24 February 1989
| align="center"| TBC
|-
| align="center"| 220
| align="center"| Episode Seventeen
| align="center"| Sarah Daniels
| align="center"| Ronald Smedley
| align="center"| 28 February 1989
| align="center"| TBC
|-
| align="center"| 221
| align="center"| Episode Eighteen
| align="center"| Sarah Daniels
| align="center"| Ronald Smedley
| align="center"| 3 March 1989
| align="center"| TBC
|-
| align="center"| 222
| align="center"| Episode Nineteen
| align="center"| David Angus
| align="center"| Ronald Smedley
| align="center"| 7 March 1989
| align="center"| TBC
|-
| align="center"| 223
| align="center"| Episode Twenty
| align="center"| David Angus
| align="center"| Ronald Smedley
| align="center"| 10 March 1989
| align="center"| TBC
|-
|}

Series 13 (1990) 

{| class="wikitable" style="width:100%;"
|-
! style="background: #ADD8E6; color:white"| No.
! style="background: #ADD8E6; color:white"| Episode
! style="background: #ADD8E6; color:white"| Writer
! style="background: #ADD8E6; color:white"| Director
! style="background: #ADD8E6; color:white"| Original airdate
! style="background: #ADD8E6; color:white"| UK viewers (millions)
|-
| align="center"| 224
| align="center"| Episode One
| align="center"| Barry Purchese
| align="center"| John Smith
| align="center"| 2 January 1990
| align="center"| TBC
|-
| align="center"| 225
| align="center"| Episode Two
| align="center"| John Smith
| align="center"| John Smith
| align="center"| 5 January 1990
| align="center"| TBC
|-
| align="center"| 226
| align="center"| Episode Three
| align="center"| Chris Ellis
| align="center"| John Smith
| align="center"| 9 January 1990
| align="center"| TBC
|-
| align="center"| 227
| align="center"| Episode Four
| align="center"| Margaret Simpson
| align="center"| John Smith
| align="center"| 12 January 1990
| align="center"| TBC
|-
| align="center"| 228
| align="center"| Episode Five
| align="center"| Margaret Simpson
| align="center"| Andrew Whitman
| align="center"| 16 January 1990
| align="center"| TBC
|-
| align="center"| 229
| align="center"| Episode Six 
| align="center"| Kay Trainor
| align="center"| Andrew Whitman
| align="center"| 19 January 1990
| align="center"| TBC
|-
| align="center"| 230
| align="center"| Episode Seven
| align="center"| Kay Trainer
| align="center"| Andrew Whitman
| align="center"| 23 January 1990
| align="center"| TBC
|-
| align="center"| 231
| align="center"| Episode Eight
| align="center"| David Angus
| align="center"| Andrew Whitman
| align="center"| 26 January 1990
| align="center"| TBC
|-
| align="center"| 232
| align="center"| Episode Nine
| align="center"| Barry Purchese
| align="center"| Richard Kelly
| align="center"| 30 January 1990
| align="center"| TBC
|-
| align="center"| 233
| align="center"| Episode Ten
| align="center"| Barry Purchese
| align="center"| Richard Kelly
| align="center"| 2 February 1990
| align="center"| TBC
|-
| align="center"| 234
| align="center"| Episode Eleven
| align="center"| Margaret Simpson
| align="center"| Richard Kelly
| align="center"| 6 February 1990
| align="center"| TBC
|-
| align="center"| 235
| align="center"| Episode Twelve
| align="center"| Margaret Simpson
| align="center"| Richard Kelly
| align="center"| 9 February 1990
| align="center"| TBC
|-
| align="center"| 236
| align="center"| Episode Thirteen
| align="center"| Sarah Daniels
| align="center"| Riitta-Leena Lynn
| align="center"| 13 February 1990
| align="center"| TBC
|-
| align="center"| 237
| align="center"| Episode Fourteen
| align="center"| Sarah Daniels
| align="center"| Riitta-Leena Lynn
| align="center"| 16 February 1990
| align="center"| TBC
|-
| align="center"| 238
| align="center"| Episode Fifteen
| align="center"| Kevin Hood
| align="center"| Riitta-Leena Lynn
| align="center"| 20 February 1990
| align="center"| TBC
|-
| align="center"| 239
| align="center"| Episode Sixteen
| align="center"| Kevin Hood
| align="center"| Riitta-Leena Lynn
| align="center"| 23 February 1990
| align="center"| TBC
|-
| align="center"| 240
| align="center"| Episode Seventeen
| align="center"| Chris Ellis
| align="center"| Richard Kelly
| align="center"| 27 February 1990
| align="center"| TBC
|-
| align="center"| 241
| align="center"| Episode Eighteen
| align="center"| Barry Purchese
| align="center"| Richard Kelly
| align="center"| 2 March 1990
| align="center"| TBC
|-
| align="center"| 242
| align="center"| Episode Nineteen
| align="center"| David Angus
| align="center"| Richard Kelly
| align="center"| 6 March 1990
| align="center"| TBC
|-
| align="center"| 243
| align="center"| Episode Twenty
| align="center"| David Angus
| align="center"| Richard Kelly
| align="center"| 9 March 1990
| align="center"| TBC
|-
|}

Series 14 (1991) 

{| class="wikitable" style="width:100%;"
|-
! style="background: #0000CD; color:white"| No.
! style="background: #0000CD; color:white"| Episode
! style="background: #0000CD; color:white"| Writer
! style="background: #0000CD; color:white"| Director
! style="background: #0000CD; color:white"| Original airdate
! style="background: #0000CD; color:white"| UK viewers (millions)
|-
| align="center"| 244
| align="center"| Episode One
| align="center"| Sarah Daniels
| align="center"| Riitta-Leena Lynn
| align="center"| 8 January 1991
| align="center"| TBC
|-
| align="center"| 245
| align="center"| Episode Two
| align="center"| Kay Trainer
| align="center"| Riitta-Leena Lynn
| align="center"| 11 January 1991
| align="center"| TBC
|-
| align="center"| 246
| align="center"| Episode Three
| align="center"| Kay Trainer
| align="center"| Riitta-Leena Lynn
| align="center"| 15 January 1991
| align="center"| TBC
|-
| align="center"| 247
| align="center"| Episode Four
| align="center"| Barry Purchese
| align="center"| Riitta-Leena Lynn
| align="center"| 18 January 1991
| align="center"| TBC
|-
| align="center"| 248
| align="center"| Episode Five
| align="center"| Barry Purchese
| align="center"| Richard Kelly
| align="center"| 22 January 1991
| align="center"| TBC
|-
| align="center"| 249
| align="center"| Episode Six 
| align="center"| Margaret Simpson
| align="center"| Richard Kelly
| align="center"| 25 January 1991
| align="center"| TBC
|-
| align="center"| 250
| align="center"| Episode Seven
| align="center"| Kevin Hood
| align="center"| Richard Kelly
| align="center"| 29 January 1991
| align="center"| TBC
|-
| align="center"| 251
| align="center"| Episode Eight
| align="center"| Chris Ellis
| align="center"| Richard Kelly
| align="center"| 1 February 1991
| align="center"| TBC
|-
| align="center"| 252
| align="center"| Episode Nine
| align="center"| Margaret Simpson
| align="center"| Albert Barber
| align="center"| 5 February 1991
| align="center"| TBC
|-
| align="center"| 253
| align="center"| Episode Ten
| align="center"| Margaret Simpson
| align="center"| Albert Barber
| align="center"| 8 February 1991
| align="center"| TBC
|-
| align="center"| 254
| align="center"| Episode Eleven
| align="center"| Barry Purchese
| align="center"| Richard Kelly
| align="center"| 12 February 1991
| align="center"| TBC
|-
| align="center"| 255
| align="center"| Episode Twelve
| align="center"| Chris Ellis
| align="center"| Albert Barber
| align="center"| 15 February 1991
| align="center"| TBC
|-
| align="center"| 256
| align="center"| Episode Thirteen
| align="center"| Chris Ellis
| align="center"| Albert Barber
| align="center"| 19 February 1991
| align="center"| TBC
|-
| align="center"| 257
| align="center"| Episode Fourteen
| align="center"| Sarah Daniels
| align="center"| Richard Kelly
| align="center"| 22 February 1991
| align="center"| TBC
|-
| align="center"| 258
| align="center"| Episode Fifteen
| align="center"| Kevin Hood
| align="center"| Richard Kelly
| align="center"| 26 February 1991
| align="center"| TBC
|-
| align="center"| 259
| align="center"| Episode Sixteen
| align="center"| David Angus
| align="center"| Richard Kelly
| align="center"| 1 March 1991
| align="center"| TBC
|-
| align="center"| 260
| align="center"| Episode Seventeen
| align="center"| Kevin Hood
| align="center"| David Andrews
| align="center"| 5 March 1991
| align="center"| TBC
|-
| align="center"| 261
| align="center"| Episode Eighteen
| align="center"| David Angus
| align="center"| David Andrews
| align="center"| 8 March 1991
| align="center"| TBC
|-
| align="center"| 262
| align="center"| Episode Nineteen
| align="center"| David Angus
| align="center"| Albert Barber
| align="center"| 12 March 1991
| align="center"| TBC
|-
| align="center"| 263
| align="center"| Episode Twenty
| align="center"| Sarah Daniels
| align="center"| David Andrews
| align="center"| 15 March 1991
| align="center"| TBC
|-
|}

Series 15 (1992) 

{| class="wikitable" style="width:100%;"
|-
! style="background: #15F4EE; color:white"| No.
! style="background: #15F4EE; color:white"| Episode
! style="background: #15F4EE; color:white"| Writer
! style="background: #15F4EE; color:white"| Director
! style="background: #15F4EE; color:white"| Original airdate
! style="background: #15F4EE; color:white"| UK viewers (millions)
|-
| align="center"| 264
| align="center"| Episode One
| align="center"| Chris Ellis
| align="center"| Richard Kelly
| align="center"| 7 January 1992
| align="center"| TBC
|-
| align="center"| 265
| align="center"| Episode Two
| align="center"| Chris Ellis
| align="center"| Richard Kelly
| align="center"| 10 January 1992
| align="center"| TBC
|-
| align="center"| 266
| align="center"| Episode Three
| align="center"| Chris Ellis
| align="center"| Richard Kelly
| align="center"| 14 January 1992
| align="center"| TBC
|-
| align="center"| 267
| align="center"| Episode Four
| align="center"| Chris Ellis
| align="center"| Richard Kelly
| align="center"| 17 January 1992
| align="center"| TBC
|-
| align="center"| 268
| align="center"| Episode Five
| align="center"| Sarah Daniels
| align="center"| Albert Barber
| align="center"| 21 January 1992
| align="center"| TBC
|-
| align="center"| 269
| align="center"| Episode Six
| align="center"| Sarah Daniels
| align="center"| Albert Barber
| align="center"| 24 January 1992
| align="center"| TBC
|-
| align="center"| 270
| align="center"| Episode Seven
| align="center"| Sarah Daniels
| align="center"| Albert Barber
| align="center"| 28 January 1992
| align="center"| TBC
|-
| align="center"| 271
| align="center"| Episode Eight
| align="center"| Sarah Daniels
| align="center"| Albert Barber
| align="center"| 31 January 1992
| align="center"| TBC
|-
| align="center"| 272
| align="center"| Episode Nine
| align="center"| Alison Fisher
| align="center"| Richard Kelly
| align="center"| 4 February 1992
| align="center"| TBC
|-
| align="center"| 273
| align="center"| Episode Ten
| align="center"| Alison Fisher
| align="center"| Richard Kelly
| align="center"| 7 February 1992
| align="center"| TBC
|-
| align="center"| 274
| align="center"| Episode Eleven
| align="center"| Chris Ellis
| align="center"| Richard Kelly
| align="center"| 11 February 1992
| align="center"| TBC
|-
| align="center"| 275
| align="center"| Episode Twelve
| align="center"| Chris Ellis
| align="center"| Richard Kelly
| align="center"| 14 February 1992
| align="center"| TBC
|-
| align="center"| 276
| align="center"| Episode Thirteen
| align="center"| Kevin Hood
| align="center"| Vivienne Cozens
| align="center"| 18 February 1992
| align="center"| TBC
|-
| align="center"| 277
| align="center"| Episode Fourteen
| align="center"| Kevin Hood
| align="center"| Vivienne Cozens
| align="center"| 21 February 1992
| align="center"| TBC
|-
| align="center"| 278
| align="center"| Episode Fifteen
| align="center"| Kevin Hood
| align="center"| Vivienne Cozens
| align="center"| 25 February 1992
| align="center"| TBC
|-
| align="center"| 279
| align="center"| Episode Sixteen
| align="center"| Kevin Hood
| align="center"| Vivienne Cozens
| align="center"| 28 February 1992
| align="center"| TBC
|-
| align="center"| 280
| align="center"| Episode Seventeen
| align="center"| Barry Purchese
| align="center"| Nigel Douglas
| align="center"| 3 March 1992
| align="center"| TBC
|-
| align="center"| 281
| align="center"| Episode Eighteen
| align="center"| Barry Purchese
| align="center"| Nigel Douglas
| align="center"| 6 March 1992
| align="center"| TBC
|-
| align="center"| 282
| align="center"| Episode Nineteen
| align="center"| Margaret Simpson
| align="center"| Nigel Douglas
| align="center"| 10 March 1992
| align="center"| TBC
|-
| align="center"| 283
| align="center"| Episode Twenty
| align="center"| Margaret Simpson
| align="center"| Nigel Douglas
| align="center"| 13 March 1992
| align="center"| TBC
|-
|}

Series 16 (1993)

Series 17 (1994)

Series 18 (1995)

Series 19 (1996)

Series 20 (1997)

Series 21 (1998)

Series 22 (1999)

Series 23 (2000)

Series 24 (2001)

Series 25 (2002)

Series 26 (2003)

Series 27 (2004)

Series 28 (2005)

Series 29 (2005)

Series 30 (2007)

Series 31 (2008)

References

Grange Hill
Lists of British children's television series episodes
Lists of British teen drama television series episodes